Lucknow Municipal Corporation (LMC) is a local government for Lucknow, the capital and the largest city of the Indian state of Uttar Pradesh. It is responsible for the civic infrastructure and administration in the city of Lucknow, in short it is also known as LMC.

In 2021, LMC passed a budget of 1946.82 Crore INR for the financial year 2021-2022.

Main functions  
This local governing body is responsible for planning and development of several civic community and infrastructure within different parts of the city. The LMC is concerned with providing local amenities to the citizens.

 Maintenance & development of roads, subways, bridges, and flyovers
 Spreading green environment concept
 Developing the slums into better living zones for backward classes
 Construction of health units, schools, and food canteens
 Garbage disposal unit at every part of the city
 Providing sufficient water and electricity facility
 Free education with meal and clothes to poverty ridden children up to 12 years.

Apart from these social services, the LMC is concentrating on preserving the city heritage structure and buildings. The municipality is responsible for issuing of birth and death certificate to city residents. This policy helps in maintaining a record on the population growth rate.

The city development plan (CDP) is a project undertaken by LMC in association with JNNURM. The main purpose of this project is to offer a through city assessment. This is required for development of the Lucknow city in the near future. There is a 3-tier strategy to be implanted under this plan:

 Infrastructure & service delivery improvement
 Basic services to urban poor
 Institutional & governance reforms

The CDP formulation procedure was carried out after consulting the entire stakeholders associated with this project. One on one discussion session with every stakeholder was carried out.

Under the three-tier strategy, major issues to be focused and services offered include:

 Water Supply
 Sewerage and Sanitation
 Solid Waste Management
 Drainage
 Transportation

Another project undertaken by LMC is city GIS mapping. The municipality will conduct a detailed GIS mapping of the city. This will help in locating any area within the city through internet. It is also a part of JNNURM program. Funding for this project is being provided by Central Government.

Developments 
On 2 December 2020, LMC got listed on Bombay Stock Exchange (BSE), becoming the first civic body in north India to issue bonds under Atal Mission for Rejuvenation and Urban Transformation (AMRUT).

Departments 
There are 7 working departments which comes under LMC.

 Health Department
 Home Tax Department
 Air Quality Management
 Garden Department
 Publicity Department
 Accounts Department
 Property Department

Administration 

 The LMC is headed by an IAS officer who serves as Municipal Commissioner and appointed by the Uttar Pradesh Government, having all the executive powers.
 The Mayor, usually from the majority party, serves as head of the house. Mayor is known as the first citizen of the city.

The current municipal commissioner is IAS Indrajeet Singh. The office of the mayor and deputy mayor is vacant since 20 January 2023 until the next elections.

Legislature

LMC consists of 110 wards for which a quinquennial election is held to elect corporators, who are responsible for basic civic infrastructure and enforcing duty in their constituencies (wards).

Various political parties nominate their candidates and the people of respective wards cast their votes during elections to elect the corporator for their ward.

Mayor 

The mayor is elected from within the ranks of the council in a quinquennial election. The elections are conducted in all 110 wards in the city to elect corporators. The party that wins the maximum number of seats holds an internal voting to decide the mayor. Mayor is considered as the first citizen of the city.

Sanyukta Bhatia was the first women mayor of city till 19 January 2023. She was elected in 2017 LMC election and took the oath of the office on 12 December 2017 and completed her tenure as mayor till the dissolution of the corporation house.

LMC elections

Mayor elections

2017

2012

2006

Corporator elections of 2017

Source:

See also
Lucknow
List of mayors of Lucknow
List of municipal corporations in India
2017 Lucknow Municipal Corporation election
2022 Lucknow Municipal Corporation election

References

External links
 

 
Municipal corporations in Uttar Pradesh
Year of establishment missing
Lucknow